The Delaware Sea Witch is a legendary woman accused and executed for witchcraft in Colonial Delaware. The story is tied closely to the demise of  a Royal Navy ship that sank on May 23, 1798, in the Delaware Bay off the coast of Cape Henlopen. The legend states that a woman was accused of witchcraft while on a ship bound for Philadelphia, she was accused of conjuring a dangerous storm. She was then forced overboard where she drowned in the Delaware Bay. Some reports state that the witch was blamed for the storm that sank HMS Braak in 1798.

Despite the legend, there was only one documented witch trial in colonial Delaware was that of Margaret Mattson. She was a Swedish settler, who came to be known as “Witch of Ridley Creek."

Lost treasure
HMS Braak sank in May 1798. The ship capsized, drowning pilot Andrew Drew and 35 of his crew, as well as their 12 Spanish prisoners. 

Rumor spread that the ship had been carrying a large treasure of gold and silver. Various expeditions were made trying to locate the missing treasure, including the "Colstadt expedition from New England." The Colstadt searched for over three years, and kept running into bad weather. One day the Colstadt group tried to change the weather by "raising a witch," as they burned a witch effigy.

In April 1937, copper coins began turning up on nearby Rehoboth beaches, a short distance from the wreck. This ignited new interest in the legend of the treasure.

It was not until 1980s when a number of artifacts were raised. Maritime archaeologists criticized these efforts for their disregard for proper archaeological methods, and for their discarding of anything not considered inherently valuable. In 1986, Braaks hull was raised, but in such a way that considerable damage was done to both it and the surrounding area of archaeological interest.

The hull was eventually placed in the county museum, as were many of the artifacts recovered, including items such as decanters, bottles, and glasses. Only a small amount of coin was recovered, worth considerably less than the cost of the large number of salvage attempts that had been undertaken over the years. The treatment of the wreck of Braak, and of many others like it, was a contributing factor to the passage of the Abandoned Shipwrecks Act of 1987.

Popular culture
The Rehoboth Sea Witch Festival, which draws its name not from the legend, but instead of the historic schooner of the same name, began in 1989. 

The crew of the Sea Witch all perished in a snow storm in December 1847.

See also
 Maryland Witch Trials

References

Witch trials in North America
Women sentenced to death
American witchcraft
Urban legends